Metadula is a monotypic moth genus in the family Lasiocampidae first described by Francis Walker in 1865. Its only species, Metadula indecisa, described by the same author in the same year, is found in the region around the Zambezi rivier.

References

Lasiocampidae
Monotypic moth genera